St. Michael the Archangel Church is a historic Russian Orthodox church along Lake Avenue, in Cordova, Alaska. Now it is under Diocese of Alaska of the Orthodox Church in America.

It is a rectangular wood-frame structure with a moderately pitched roof, and a small entrance vestibule whose roof echoes the main roof line.  The exterior is largely unadorned, owing to frequent windy conditions in the area.  It was built in 1925 and has a modest appearance, in the generally simple style of the earlier Russian Orthodox church at Belkofski.  The church interior was completely rebuilt and modernized in the 1970s.

The church was added to the National Register of Historic Places in 1980.

See also
National Register of Historic Places listings in Chugach Census Area, Alaska

References

External links

Buildings and structures on the National Register of Historic Places in Chugach Census Area, Alaska
Churches completed in 1925
Churches on the National Register of Historic Places in Alaska
Cordova, Alaska
Russian Orthodox church buildings in Alaska